The 2015 California wildfire season was a series of wildfires that burned across the state of California. Approximately 3,159 structures were damaged or destroyed by wildfires, and at least 7 fatalities were recorded.

Nationwide fire season
The National Interagency Fire Center reported in mid-August that the 2015 fire season had been the most destructive since 2011. Nationwide, a total of  had burned, which is roughly triple the total land area burned from the same time span in 2014. By the end of August, in terms of the land area burned, the 2015 nationwide wildfire season had surpassed any other wildfire season in the last 10 years, with  burned.

Fatalities
The season also proved to be a deadly one for firefighters battling the many blazes throughout the state. A United States Forest Service member from South Dakota died on July 31 from carbon monoxide poisoning, while battling the Frog Fire in the Modoc National Forest. A second firefighter was killed on August 8 by a falling tree, while battling the Sierra Fire south of Echo Summit. A 72-year-old disabled woman was killed in her home by the fast-moving Valley Fire.

Fires 
Below is a list of all fires that exceeded  during the 2015 California wildfire season, as well as the fires that caused significant damage. The information is taken from CAL FIRE's list of large fires, and other sources where indicated.

See also
 List of California wildfires
 2015 Oregon wildfires
 2015 Washington wildfires
 Climate change in California
 2014–15 North American winter

References

External links

 2015 California Fire Map  (a Google map created by CAL FIRE) 
 California current incident information from CAL FIRE  
 California wildfires on the US Forestry Incident Information System  (InciWeb)

 
Wildfires in California by year
California, 2015